Dino Grandi (4 June 1895 – 21 May 1988), 1st Conte di Mordano, was an Italian Fascist politician, minister of justice, minister of foreign affairs and president of parliament.

Early life 
Born at Mordano, province of Bologna, Grandi was a graduate in law and economics at the University of Bologna in 1919 (after serving in World War I). Grandi started a career as a lawyer in Imola. Attracted to the political left, he nonetheless became impressed with Benito Mussolini after the two met in 1914, and became a staunch advocate of Italy's entry into the World War.

He joined the Blackshirts at age 25, and was one of 35 Fascist delegates elected, along with Mussolini, in May 1921 to the Chamber of Deputies. Grandi survived an ambush carried out by leftist militants in 1920, and had his studio devastated on one occasion.

Fascist statesman 

After the March on Rome on 28 October 1922, in which the Fascists took power in Italy, Grandi became part of the new government; first as the undersecretary of the interior (1923), then as the Italian Minister of Foreign Affairs (1929) and then as Italy's ambassador to the United Kingdom (1932 to 1939). Grandi was an ally to the most radical and violent groups of fascists, always surrounding himself with members of the Blackshirts. He used his power base to voice criticism of Mussolini's attempt to reach an armistice with left-wingers and was at one point under suspicion for having attempted to replace the latter with the skeptical alleged Mussolini forerunner Gabriele D'Annunzio.

In 1939, he was recalled to Italy after attempting a pact between his country and Britain to prevent Italy from entering World War II. Under pressure from Hitler, Mussolini removed him from the post of ambassador and appointed him Minister of Justice. As a diplomat, Grandi created a net of connections that were rivaled only by Mussolini's son-in-law, Galeazzo Ciano, and he attempted to use it for his own gains. Thus, he persuaded King Victor Emmanuel III to grant him a title in 1937, and he managed to retain a comfortable position until he was sent by Mussolini to the Greek Front with the other Gerarchi in 1941. As Mussolini's ambassador to London, he had affairs with some of the most influential noblewomen of the time—including Lady Alexandra Curzon, daughter of the Viceroy of India, George Curzon.

Grandi opposed the antisemitic Italian racial laws of 1938, and the country's entry into World War II. He was dropped from the Cabinet in February 1943 for his increasing criticism of the war effort.

Fall of Mussolini and aftermath 

As the war began to have its devastating effect on Italy after the Allied invasion of Sicily, Grandi and other members of the Fascist Grand Council met on 24 July 1943. When Mussolini said that the Germans were thinking of evacuating the south, Grandi launched a blistering attack on his former comrade-in-arms. He then made a motion (Ordine del giorno Grandi) asking King Victor Emmanuel III to resume his full constitutional authority. The resolution, voted at 2:00 on 25 July, passed by a vote of 19 to 8, with one abstention, effectively removing Mussolini from office. Those leading government figures who had voted for the resolution included Giuseppe Bottai and Emilio De Bono as well as Grandi. The King had Mussolini arrested the same day. Grandi also negotiated a truce with the left-wing movements, notably with the trade unions (grouped in the Confederazione Generale Italiana del Lavoro), which gave way to the Italian resistance movement against Nazi Germany.

While the Allies occupied the south, an alternate Fascist government was established in Northern Italy as the Italian Social Republic. It sentenced Grandi to death in absentia for treason in the Verona trial that took place on 8 to 10 January 1944. Grandi, however, had made sure to flee to Francisco Franco's Spain in August 1943. He lived there, then in Portugal (1943–1948), Argentina, and then São Paulo, Brazil, until he returned to Italy in the 1960s; he died in Bologna. Coincidentally, Grandi died on the same weekend as two postwar Italian Fascist leaders. Like Grandi, Pino Romualdi died on 21 May 1988, and Giorgio Almirante died the following day.

References

External links

 

1895 births
1988 deaths
People from the Province of Bologna
Counts of Italy
Members of the Grand Council of Fascism
Foreign ministers of Italy
Mussolini Cabinet
Deputies of Legislature XXVI of the Kingdom of Italy
Members of the Chamber of Fasces and Corporations
Ambassadors of Italy to the United Kingdom
20th-century Italian lawyers
Italian military personnel of World War I
Italian people of World War II
People sentenced to death in absentia
Recipients of the Order of Saints Maurice and Lazarus
Exiled Italian politicians
Recipients of the Order of the White Eagle (Poland)